Balbir Singh Sidhu (11 December 1931 – 10 December 2016) was a Kenyan field hockey player. He competed in the men's tournament at the 1956 Summer Olympics.

References

External links
 

1931 births
2016 deaths
Kenyan male field hockey players
Olympic field hockey players of Kenya
Field hockey players at the 1956 Summer Olympics
Sportspeople from Nairobi
Kenyan people of Indian descent
Kenyan people of Punjabi descent
Kenyan emigrants to the United Kingdom
British sportspeople of Indian descent
British people of Punjabi descent